Operation Underworld was the United States government's code name for the cooperation of Italian and Jewish organized crime figures from 1942 to 1945 to counter Axis spies and saboteurs along the U.S. northeastern seaboard ports, avoid wartime labor union strikes, and limit theft by black-marketeers of vital war supplies and equipment.

In the first three months after the Attack on Pearl Harbor on December 7, 1941, the U.S. lost 120 merchant ships to German U-boats and surface raiders in the Battle of the Atlantic, and in February 1942 the ocean liner SS Normandie – a captured French ship that was being refitted as a troop ship in New York harbor – was allegedly sabotaged and sunk by arson in the Port of New York. The Mafia boss Albert Anastasia claimed responsibility for the sabotage. Although the United States government claimed the loss of the Normandie was an accident, many Americans were skeptical and thought the destruction was planned by the Nazis. Several Axis spies and saboteurs were arrested and hanged, but no evidence was ever produced linking Axis spies to the loss of the Normandie. After the war, Axis records claimed no sabotage operation had existed and no evidence has ever been produced on the Allied side to indicate there had been underworld sabotage.
 
Nevertheless, fears about possible sabotage or disruption of the waterfront led Commander Charles R. Haffenden of the U.S. Navy Office of Naval Intelligence (ONI) Third Naval District in New York to set up a special security unit. He sought the help of Joseph Lanza, who ran the Fulton Fish Market, to get intelligence about the New York waterfront, control the labor unions, and identify possible refueling and resupply operations for German submarines with the help of the fishing industry along the Atlantic Coast. 
 
To cover Lanza’s activities, he approached  Meyer Lansky and solicited his help in reaching Charles Luciano who was an important boss of the five New York Mafia crime families. Luciano agreed to cooperate with authorities in hopes of consideration for early release from prison.
 
In 1936, Luciano had been tried and convicted for compulsory prostitution and running a prostitution racket after years of investigation by District Attorney Thomas E. Dewey. He was sentenced to 30 to 50 years in prison, but during World War II an agreement was struck with the Department of the Navy through his associate Meyer Lansky to provide naval intelligence. In 1946, for his alleged wartime cooperation, Luciano's sentence was commuted on the condition that he be deported to Italy.  
 
Luciano’s contacts even assisted in the Allies’ 1943 amphibious invasion of Sicily by providing maps of the island’s harbors, photographs of its coastline and names of trusted contacts inside the Sicilian Mafia, who also wished to see Mussolini toppled.  Luciano directed Calogero Vizzini to assist the Allied Forces in the invasion of Italy. Vizzini is the central character in the history of direct Mafia support for the Allied Forces during the invasion of Sicily in 1943. Vizzini spent 6 days on an American tank during the Allied invasion of Italy, guiding Allied forces through the mountain pass and directing his Sicilian Mafia to eliminate Italian snipers in the mountains.
 
Luciano was in Dannemora at the time, serving a 30 to 50-year sentence for running a prostitution ring. For his cooperation he was moved to a more convenient and comfortable open prison in Great Meadows in May 1942. Luciano’s influence in stopping sabotage remains unclear, but authorities did note that strikes on the docks stopped after Luciano’s attorney Moses Polakoff contacted underworld figures with influence over the longshoremen and their unions. In 1946 Luciano's sentence was commuted – after serving 9½ years – and he was deported to his native Italy.

References

Further reading
Campbell, Rodney (1977). The Luciano Project: The Secret Wartime Collaboration of the Mafia and the U.S. Navy, New York: McGraw-Hill,  
Newark, Tim (2007). Mafia Allies. The True Story of America’s Secret Alliance with the Mob in World War II, Saint Paul (MN): Zenith Press  (Review)

United States home front during World War II
American Mafia events
Jewish-American organized crime events
Office of Naval Intelligence